Murrhardt is a town in the Rems-Murr district, in Baden-Württemberg, Germany. It is located 12 km east of Backnang, and 18 km southwest of Schwäbisch Hall. The source of the Murr is situated in Murrhardt.

Local council (Gemeinderat)

Elections were held in May 2014:
Christian Democratic Union of Germany / Free Electoral Union: 32.64% = 6 seats
Social Democratic Party of Germany: 23.77% = 4 seats
UL Independent list: 23.43% = 4 seats
MD/AL-Murrhardt Democrats / Alternative List: 20,17 % = 4 seats

Mayor
Armin Mößner (CDU) was elected in July 2011 with 66,42 % of the vote. His predecessor was Dr. Gerhard Strobel.

Sons and daughters of the town

 Heinrich von Zügel (1850-1941), painter

References

Rems-Murr-Kreis
Württemberg